The Burid dynasty was a dynasty of Turkic origin which ruled over the Emirate of Damascus in the early 12th century.

History

The first Burid ruler, Toghtekin, began as a servant to the Seljuk ruler of Damascus, Duqaq. Following Duqaq's death in 1104, he seized the city for himself.

The dynasty was named after Toghtekin's son, Taj al-Muluk Buri. The Burids gained recognition from the Abbasid caliphate in return for considerable gifts. In return, the caliphate did not interfere in the emirate.

The Burids ruled the city until 1154, when it was taken by the ruler of Aleppo, Nur ed-Din, founder of the Zengid dynasty.

The Burids lost to the Crusaders in the battle of Marj al-Saffar (1126) but were able to prevent the Second Crusade from capturing Damascus.

Burid emirs of Damascus

Green shaded row signifies regency of Mu'in ad-Din Unur.

Family Tree

See also
 List of Sunni Muslim dynasties

References

Medieval Damascus
12th century in Asia
Turkic dynasties
 
1104 establishments in Asia
Syrian people of Turkish descent
12th-century disestablishments in Asia
12th century in the Seljuk Empire
Sunni dynasties
12th century in the Abbasid Caliphate
Burid dynasty